Giuseppe Stampone (born in Cluses, France) is a visual artist who lives and works between Rome and Brussels. His artistic production ranges from multimedia installations and videos to drawings made with Bic pen, a technique common to several of his projects. The work of Stampone is that of an artist-activist in an age of so-called crisis. In a time of rising public vigilance, his art is unabashedly a potent form of political protest. He is the founder of Solstizio Project, in collaboration with the European Union and developed in different Countries of the world.
Stampone collaborates with various universities as the Accademia delle Belle Arti di Urbino where he teaches "Tecniche e Tecnologie delle Arti Visive" IULM of Milan, the Federico II University of Naples and the McLuhan Program in Culture and Technology of Toronto. He elaborates interventions of research and experimentation about art and new media with Alberto Abruzzese and Derrick De Kerckhove.

Work

Stampone continuously seeks to introduce an alternative socio-political agenda through his art works and community-based interventions. His approach is nuanced and methodical, inviting audiences to meditate on basic issues such as immigration, water and war, even as they find themselves having to endure those natural and man-made disasters and conflicts that seem to abound today.

In 2008 he founded the special project Solstizio, a multilayered platform that operates between didactics, art, eco-social issues and new-media, in collaboration with public and private authorities, Universities, Museums and Foundations. His art has become global and does not end in a defined project; it takes more the form of a social network, from which different ways of observation and action develop in adjacent realities in the world.

Career

Stampone's work has been exhibited widely throughout Italy and abroad, in international Art Biennial and Museums including the 56th Venice Biennial (2015); Kochi-Muziris Biennial (2012); 11th Havana Biennial (2012); Liverpool Biennial (2010); 14th and 15th Quadriennale of Rome (2004–2008); Kunsthalle City Museum in Gwangiu  (2010); American Academy in Rome (2008 – 2013 – 2014 – 2015); MIT Museum Boston (2015); Wifredo Lam Contemporary Art Center, La Havana (2012); Cabaret Voltaire, Zürich (2011); The Invisible Dog Art Center, Brooklyn-New York; MAXXI - National Museum of the 21st Century Arts – in Rome (2014); Palazzo Reale in Milan (2014); Gamec Museum in Bergamo (2010 – 2011 – 2014); “Global Education” a cura di Giacinto di Pietrantonio solo show, Prometeogallery di Ida Pisani, Milano-Lucca (2012); Macro Museum in Rome (2010–2011); "Giuseppe Stampone – The Rules of the Game", solo show, Prometeogallery di Ida Pisani, Milano-Lucca (2010);Palazzo Reale, Naples (2004); La Triennale Bovisa in Milan (2008–2009).
In 2013 was affiliated Fellowship at The American Academy in Rome and winner of the Art Residency at Young Eun Museum of Contemporary Art (YMCA), Gwangju, Korea. He won the 3° Maretti Prize (Centro per l'arte contemporanea Luigi Pecci, Prato) and the first edition of Pacco d'Artista Prize promoted by Poste Italiane. He is present at the 2017 Seoul Biennale of Architecture and Urbanism with a new Architecture of Intelligence based on the relationship between urban spaces and their surrounding ecosystems. In the same year the Civitella Ranieri Foundation visual arts jury selected Stampone for their fellowship.

Collections

Among the foundations and public collections holding work by Stampone are: Phelan Foundation, New York; La Gaia Foundation, Busca (Cuneo); Biennal Kochi-Muziris Foundation; Birbragher Foundation, Bogota;  Sidney Biennial Foundation, Sidney; La Quadriennale Foundation, Rome; LAM, Museum of Contemporary Art, La Havana; Gamec Museum, Bergamo; Istituto Nazionale per la Grafica, Rome; La Farnesina Collection, Rome. His works have been collected by, among others, Byblos, BIC, Luciano Benetton, Amy Phelan.

Monographs

 Portraits Bic Data Blue, Maretti Editore, Cesena 2014 
 Odio gli Indifferenti, Nero, Roma 2014
 Global Education – from Solstizio to We are the Planet, Damiani, Bologna 2012 
 Alfa/Omega,Maretti Editore, Cesena 2012 
 Saluti da L'Aquila, Maretti Editore, Cesena 2011
 Neodimensional Aesthetics, MMMAC, Salerno 2011
 Global Education, Parallelo42, Pescara 2011
 Private Collections, Museum L'ARCA Editions, Teramo 2011
 Maestro Giuseppe Stampone's 18 inventions + 1 that will change the world, Sara Zanin Gallery, Roma 2008 
 Giuseppe Stampone, De Luca Editori d'Arte, Roma 2006

References

External links
 
 Solstizio Project

Italian contemporary artists
Postmodern artists
1974 births
Living people